Great Barrier may refer to:

Places
 Great Barrier Island, in the north of New Zealand
 Great Barrier Reef, in the Coral Sea off the coast of Queensland in north-east Australia
 Gilf Kebir, Arabic for "the Great Barrier," a plateau in the New Valley Governorate of the remote southwest corner of Egypt
 Great Ice Barrier, a later 19th–early 20th century name for the Ross Ice Shelf, Antarctica

In fiction
 The Great Barrier (film), a 1937 British film
 "The Great Barrier" (Star Trek)
 The fourth episode of Law & Order: Criminal Intent (season 4)

See also
 Barrier (disambiguation)